The 2010 African Volleyball Championship U19 was held in Cape Town, South Africa, from September 13 to September 18, 2010. The finalists will qualify for the 2011 Youth World Championship.

Teams

Competition system
The competition system of the 2010 African Championship U19 is the single Round-Robin system. Each team plays once against each of the 4 remaining teams. Points are accumulated during the whole tournament, and the final ranking is determined by the total points gained.

Championship

|}

Results
All times are South African Standard Time (UTC+02:00).

|}

Final standing

Awards
MVP:  Marawan Mohamed
Best Spiker:  Malek Chekir
Best Blocker:  Mohamed Metawae
Best Server:  Oussama Mrika
Best Setter:  Amine Zayani
Best Receiver:  Dean Layters
Best Libero:  Mohamed Hassan

References

External links
Official website

African Volleyball Championship U19
African Volleyball Championship U19
African Volleyball Championship U19
International volleyball competitions hosted by South Africa
African Volleyball Championships
September 2010 sports events in Africa